TEG Federal Credit Union (formerly Taconic Educators and Government Federal Credit Union) is a federally chartered credit union in the New York counties of Dutchess, Orange, Westchester, Putnam, Rockland, Sullivan, and Ulster. As of 2020, the institution has $305 million in assets, 118 employees, and 36,000 members.

The credit union provides a wide range financial services including Consumer and Business Loans, Mortgages, Free Checking, and many other Consumer and Business deposit account options, plus MasterCard credit and debit cards.

History
In 1969, teachers from the Wappingers Central school district decided to create an alternative to the banks they had been using. Desiring a financial institution that would provide fair and equitable treatment, they successfully chartered the Wappingers Central Federal Credit on April 25, 1969, with the National Credit Union Administration (NCUA).

In March 1976, credit union membership expanded to include the government workers of Dutchess County and the credit union's name changed to Taconic Educational and Governmental Federal Credit Union, or TEG Federal Credit Union as it is known by today.

In August 2000, TEG received a new community charter and opened its doors to all who lived, worked, worshiped, or attended school in Dutchess County. The most recent extension of this charter in December 2002 opened up the membership to all who live, work, worship or attend school in New York's Dutchess, Orange and Ulster Counties. TEG Federal provides an annual $1,000 scholarship to student members.

Branches 
TEG FCU has branches in the following locations: Beekman, Fishkill, Hyde Park, Newburgh, Crystal Run, Poughkeepsie (Main Office - 1 Commerce St), Poughkeepsie (College Center -  11 Marist Dr) and Wappingers Falls.

References

External links
TEG Official website
TEG at Credit Union Access

Credit unions based in New York (state)
Poughkeepsie, New York
Organizations based in New York (state)
Companies based in Dutchess County, New York
Banks established in 1969